The Watermen's Museum is a museum in Yorktown, Virginia. It documents the history of Chesapeake Bay 'watermen', from pre-colonial to modern times.

The Museum is located on Water Street and open to the public from April to December.

See also
List of maritime museums in the United States

References

External links
 Website

Maritime museums in Virginia
Chesapeake Bay
Museums in York County, Virginia